Cigaritis nyassae, the Nyassa silverline, is a butterfly in the family Lycaenidae. It is found in Uganda, western Kenya, Tanzania, Malawi, Mozambique and possibly Zimbabwe.

The larvae feed on Acacia stenocarpa, Entada abyssinica and Mundulea species. Young larvae feed on the terminal shoots of their host plant, while older larvae are found on the bark. They are always attended by ants.

References

Butterflies described in 1884
Cigaritis
Butterflies of Africa
Taxa named by Arthur Gardiner Butler